Pervy may refer to:
Perversion
Pervy Margreth, the eponymous character of the episode "The New Student" in Invisible Network of Kids
Pervy Kanal (Channel One in Russia)

Russian rural localities
Chegem Pervy (Чеге́м Пе́рвый) a 1972 settlement renamed in 2000
Pervy May in Uchalinsky District of Bashkortostan
Volchy-Pervy in Volokonovsky District of Belgorod Oblast